The Project of the Century is a 2015 film directed by Carlos M. Quintela. The director's second feature film, it was screened at a number of international festivals, such as the Havana Film Festival, the Miami International Film Festival, and the International Film Festival Rotterdam, where it won the prestigious Tiger Award.

"The Project of the Century" alludes to the Juragua Nuclear Power Plant, a Soviet-Cuban project abandoned in 1992 following the collapse of the Soviet Union. The film, set in the workers’ town built next to the abandoned power plant, was shot in black-and-white. Quintela made use of archive footage from Cuban television.

The film was acquired by German sales company M-appeal.

Synopsis 
The film follows three generations of lonely Cuban men who struggle to co-exist under the same roof in a city once pledged to become the center of the Soviet nuclear project in the Caribbean.

Cast 
 Mario Balmaseda (as Otto)
 Mario Guerra (as Rafael)
 Leonardo Gascón (as Leo)
 Damarys Gutiérrez (as Marta)
Manuel Porto
 Jorge Molina

Awards and accolades 
 2015 Tiger Award (winner)

References

External links 
 

Cuban drama films
Films set in Cuba
Films shot in Cuba
2015 films